A. pyramidalis  may refer to:
 Actinostrobus pyramidalis, the swamp cypress, a coniferous tree species endemic to southwestern Western Australia
 Aechmea pyramidalis, a plant species native to Ecuador
 Ajuga pyramidalis, a flowering plant species native to Europe
 Anacamptis pyramidalis, the pyramidal orchid, a plant species native to southwestern Eurasia
 Aspella pyramidalis, a sea snail species

See also
 Pyramidalis (disambiguation)